The Spring Arcade Building in Downtown Los Angeles, also known as the Broadway Arcade, refers to three adjoining buildings opened in 1924 on the site of the historic Mercantile Place, which in turn had been constructed on property once used as a schoolhouse, facing both Broadway and Spring Street midway between Fifth and Sixth streets in the Downtown district. The Arcade Building was built in the Beaux Arts and Spanish Baroque styles.

Spring Street School

In 1883, the Los Angeles school board purchased a parcel of land fronting on both Broadway and Spring Street, midblock between Fifth and Sixth streets (the present Arcade site), for $12,500, and Spring Street School became the first recorded structure on the land.

Mercantile Place

Real estate

By 1904 the Broadway-Spring real estate had become so valuable that the school board put the land up for lease but retained the material in the old brick schoolhouse, which by then was noted to be a "landmark." As a result, in that year work began on Mercantile Place—what was planned to be "something entirely new in Los Angeles development. It was under the development of C. Westley Roberts, who secured a ten-year lease from the Los Angeles School Board and bought the material of the old brick school building, which was to be demolished."

A new street will be added to the business portion of the town. Mr. Roberts intends to cut through from Broadway to Spring street waht  he terms an "arcade," faced on two sides by stores and business offices. This "arcade" will consist of a 40-foot street straight through the property, asphalt paved and brilliantly lighted by electricity. A.F. Rosenheim, the architect of the new Hellman building at Spring and Fourth streets, is preparing plans . . . .

By 1905, Mercantile Place opened with or added the following facilities within a few years' time: A Woodmen of the World lodge hall, Curtis-Newhall general newspaper and advertising business and MacDonald's, "the largest and most complete College of Hairdressing and beauty culture in the world."

As the ten-year anniversary of the lease approached in 1913, school board members realized that the value of the property had increased from $400,000 to $1 million, which meant that the rental charged to the Mercantile Place lessee was amounting to only 2.5% a year on the valuation. A move was begun to sell the property instead of renewing the lease, and in February 1914 the board signed a renewable lease with the Mercantile Improvement Association for $3,500 a month "in order that the property may not be empty pending the sale of the property or the erection of a building thereon." The next month a special referendum election was held to ask voters what they wanted to do with the property, and in a lightly attended response 2,003 votes were cast for "lease for fifty years," 1,478 for "sell" and 931 for "neither sell nor lease for fifty years."

Atmosphere

Hundreds of Angelenos packed into Mercantile Place and adjoining Spring Street on October 31, 1911, for what was called "The largest election crowd in the history of Los Angeles" as the Los Angeles Times posted the latest bulletins concerning the mayoral election race between challenger Job Harriman and incumbent George Alexander.

By the beginning of the 1920s the privately owned street was jammed with pedestrians, automobiles and shopkeepers. A Times headline called it "Broadway's 'Appendix.' " One merchant said:

It seems very quaint to some people to find such a cove leading off of Broadway. . . . Right in the middle of our little street . . . stands a motor truck almost hidden by fruits and vegetables. To one side is a flower market, and our enterprising bootblacks have their place of business there. Just before the Fourth [of July] there were fireworks vendors there, too, and usually both sides of out street are pretty solidly parked with cars.

Arcade

Preparation and construction 

The school board sold the property for $1.155 million in 1919 to Adolph Ramish, president of the Hippodrome Theater Company, which then resold it for between $1.5 million and $2.5 million ("probably the largest cash realty transaction in the history of Los Angeles") to a group of San Francisco businessmen headed by A.C. Blumenthal. An architectural design competition was held, and the winner, [Kenneth] MacDonald and [Maurice C.] Couchot, called for "twin twelve-story office buildings on both the Broadway and Spring-street frontages, connected by a three-story arcade building, roofed over with glass."<ref name=RecordRealty>[https://search.proquest.com/docview/161323838 "Record Realty Deal Is Made," Los Angeles Times, November 7, 1922, page II-1]</ref>"Arcade Deal is Closed," Los Angeles Times, April 24, 1923, page II-2 It was said that "One of the largest theaters in the country will be erected on the old site.

The first three stories of both office buildings will be designed for stores and shops, to correspond with the arcade, which will have a width of forty feet between store fronts, providing a walk for pedestrians through the middle of the block. . . . About two-thirds of the basement . . . will be occupied by a Leighton cafeteria, making it the largest cafeteria in the world . . . with a seating capacity for 1,500 people.

Destruction of the old Mercantile Place buildings began at 5 p.m. April 24, 1923, the day that the title of ownership passed to the Mercantile Arcade Realty Company ("a syndicate of San Francisco business men"), and underpinning of the adjoining buildings to the north and south started on May 3."Builders Aim to Set Record," Los Angeles Times, August 12, 1923, page V-3

The work of underpinning was one of the most serious problems that confronted the contractors, because it involved lowering the foundations of all adjoining buildings from ten feet to thirty-five feet. This work alone necessitated the excavation of 1200 yards of dirt and replacing the same with 450,000 brick[s] and the holding up during the underpinning of 650 lineal feet of exterior walls of the adjoining buildings.

Work on the three new buildings which provided an interior passageway between Spring Street and Broadway began soon thereafter. The structural steel for the 12-story Broadway building was completed on August 21, "just two months after the first column was erected," and the steel framework for the similarly sized Spring Street building was finished two weeks later. The reinforced-concrete three-story companion Arcade building was also quickly completed, with its skylight necessitating more than 18,000 feet of glass. Robert Youmans was in charge of the work.

 Opening 

Businesses were moving in by January 7, 1925. The Arcade was publicized as a "City Within a City," with the Spring Street building designed largely for "financial houses" and the Broadway building for general tenants."Plan Early Opening of New Arcade," Los Angeles Times, January 9, 1924

When the Arcade opened in February 1924, special attention was given to Crane's Arcade Barber Shop, with each customer receiving a "clean hair brush and lather brush and comb, contained in a paraffined sack," to Desmond's Men's Arcade Shop, and to the sixth in a chain of See's Candy stores. Other tenants of note were Sun Drug, Weaver-Jackson ("The largest hair store and beauty parlor in the West") and Western Union.

The general decorative scheme . . . lends itself to beautification of the shops[,] which will be framed, as in a picture, by the soft silvery blues and modulated reds of walls and tilings. Inside the frame, each shop may devise its own decorative effects. . . . The true spaciousness of the building cannot be fully realized until one stands on the bridge at the third floor level, when the immensity of the structure is borne in upon the eye. . . .

Co-architect Kenneth MacDonald Jr. noted the "great charm and delicacy of the lace-like terra cotta which embellishes the first three floors" of the building. Some sixty years later, the buildings were described as Spanish Revival Renaissance-styled architecture.

Maturity

From its first days, the Arcade housed a branch of the U.S. Post Office at a rental of $1 a year, but after 15 years the rate was increased to $1,500 a year and in 1946 to $6,000 a year, when the branch office was abandoned.

In 1932 radio station KRKD erected two broadcast towers on the Arcade's roof. The self-supporting radio towers still stand atop the building They once supported an AM "hammock" antenna for 1150 kHz but no longer are used. A 2014 demolition permit application to remove the towers was rejected since they are a historic landmark. The towers were subsequently painted and lighted to comply with FAA regulations.

In July 1940 twelve Brunswick bowling lanes were installed in the Broadway Arcade building. In 1953, the block-long space under the Arcade was proposed as an underground garage.

Decline

By 1977, the Broadway-Spring Arcade was noted as being one of the "under-utilized and vacant buildings lining both sides" of Spring Street, and it was being eyed for conversion into "housing for low- to moderate-income elderly."

The Arcade buildings were bought by the Joseph Hellen family of Australia in the 1980s through a firm called Downtown Management.

In 2002, plans were announced by Wade Killefer of Killefer Flammang Architects to turn the 195,000 square-foot-enterprise into 142 loft-style apartments as part of a $15 million renovation, scheduled for completion in fall 2003. As part of downtown redevelopment, Hellen reportedly spent $45 million to modernize the Arcade buildings only to balk at restoration of the podium on the street level to its original look, preferring green marble instead.

In the 1990s, merchant Mohad Azimi recalled, the arcade was so crowded with shoppers that "you could barely walk inside," some of the business occasioned by a boom in immigration from Mexico and Central America. Yet by 2012 the boom had subsided, Azimi noted.

Azimi still stacks the same goods on a white plastic table at the front of his shop—toaster ovens, blenders and microwaves in battered cardboard boxes. Inside the cluttered shop, there are old keyboards, calculators and Nintendo GameCube consoles. But he makes only a few sales a week.

A Times reporter noted in November 2012 that "inside the 88-year-old shopping arcade, with its giant curved skylight, arched Spanish Renaissance entryways and Beaux Arts exterior, many of the stores are vacant, and the remaining merchants seem stuck in another era. Bargain-rate clothes, toys, suitcases and DVDs share shelf space with dusty boomboxes and T-shirts from '90s rock bands like Korn and Nirvana."

Renovation
The building is now renovated and is a mix of retail, restaurants, cafes, bars in the ground floor.

Gallery

References

Note: Access to the online "Los Angeles Times" links may require the use of a library card or fee subscription''.

External links
 

Commercial buildings in Los Angeles
Buildings and structures in Downtown Los Angeles
History of Los Angeles
Shopping arcades in the United States